Dantzig Twist is the debut studio album by French post-punk band Marquis de Sade, released in 1979 by record label Pathé.

Track listing

References

External links 

 

1979 debut albums
Marquis de Sade (band) albums
Pathé-Marconi albums